HSM-72 Helicopter Maritime Strike Squadron Seven-Two, also known as Proud Warriors is a helicopter squadron of the United States Navy based at Naval Air Station Jacksonville. The squadron was established as Helicopter Antisubmarine Squadron (Light) Forty Two (HSL-42) on 5 October 1984

Mission
The squadron employs the MH-60R multi-mission helicopter.  Primary missions include Anti-Submarine Warfare (ASW), Anti-Surface Warfare (SUW), Command, Control, Communications (CCC), Command and Control (C2) Search and Rescue (SAR), Medical Evacuation (MEDEVAC), Vertical Replenishment (VERTREP), Naval Surface Fire Support (NSFS), and Communications Relay (COMREL).

Transition from HSL-42
HSL-42 was redesignated HSM-72 on 15 January 2013 at Naval Air Station Jacksonville. The change reflected their transition from employing the SH-60B to the MH-60R, as well as from a detachment-based, expeditionary squadron to its realignment in support of a carrier air wing.  As part of this transition, then-HSL-42 relocated to NAS Jacksonville from their previous home of Naval Station Mayport.

Awards
  Meritorious Unit Commendation
  National Defense Service Medal
  Global War on Terrorism Service Medal
  Global War on Terrorism Expeditionary Medal
  Navy E Ribbon
Chief of Naval Operations Aviation Safety Award
Arleigh Burke Fleet Trophy
Captain Arnold Jay Isbell Trophy
Blue "M" for Medical Readiness
CHSMWINGLANT Talon Award

See also
 History of the United States Navy
 List of United States Navy aircraft squadrons

References

External links
HSM-72 Official Website

Helicopter maritime strike squadrons of the United States Navy
1984 establishments in the United States